The Arab Gas Pipeline is a natural gas pipeline in the Middle East. It originates near Arish in the Sinai Peninsula and was built to export Egyptian natural gas to Jordan, Syria, and Lebanon, with branch underwater and overland pipelines to and from Israel.

History
The pipeline has been used intermittently since its inauguration. Egyptian gas exports were reduced dramatically in 2011 – initially due to sabotage (mostly to its feeder pipeline in Sinai), followed by natural gas shortages in Egypt which forced it to discontinue gas exports by the mid-2010s. Sections of the pipeline continued to operate in Jordan to facilitate domestic transport of gas. The pipeline was reversed to flow gas from Jordan to Egypt from 2015 to 2018 (fed by imported LNG through Jordan's Aqaba LNG reception terminal). The recovery in Egyptian gas production has enabled gas to flow to Jordan through the link from 2018. In 2020 the pipeline also began distributing gas from Israel inside Jordan, while the underwater branch to Israel was reversed to allow gas from Israel to flow to Egypt.

Description
The pipeline's capacity could be increased by 50% by roughly doubling the number of compressor stations (to every 100 km).

Arish–Aqaba section
The first section of pipeline runs from Arish in Egypt to Aqaba in Jordan. It has three segments. It also consists of a compressor station in Arish and a metering station in Taba.

The $220 million Arish–Aqaba section was completed in July 2003. The Egyptian consortium that developed this section included EGAS, ENPPI, PETROGET and the Egyptian Natural Gas Company (GASCO).

Aqaba–El Rehab section 
The second section extended the pipeline in Jordan from Aqaba through Amman to El Rehab, ( from the Syrian border). The second section was commissioned in 2005.

Israel–Jordan connection 
As of 2018, a 65 km,  pipeline is under construction from the Jordan River near kibbutz Neve Ur on the Israel-Jordan border that will connect to the Arab Gas Pipeline near Mafraq in northern Jordan. Inside Israel the pipeline extends 23 km from the border with Jordan to near kibbutz Dovrat in the Jezreel Valley where it connects to the existing Israeli domestic natural gas distribution network. The pipeline is expected to be completed in mid-2019 and will supply Jordan with 3 BCM of natural gas per year starting in 2020.

A  gas pipeline from Israel also supplies the Jordanian Arab Potash factories near the Dead Sea, however it is located far from the Arab Gas Pipeline and is not connected to it.

El Rehab–Homs section
A  stretch runs from the Jordan–Syrian border to the Deir Ali power station. From there the pipeline runs through Damascus to the Al Rayan gas compressor station near Homs. The section was completed in February 2008, and it was built by the Syrian Petroleum Company and Stroytransgaz, a subsidiary of Gazprom.

Homs–Tripoli connection
The agreement to start supplies was signed on 2 September 2009 and test run started on 8 September 2009. Regular gas supplies started on 19 October 2009 and gas is delivered to the Deir Ammar power station.

There is a proposal to extend the branch from Banias to Cyprus.

Syria–Turkey connection
In 2006 Egypt, Syria, Jordan, Turkey, Lebanon, and Romania reached an agreement to build the pipeline's extension through Syria to the Turkish border. From there, the pipeline would have been connected to the proposed Nabucco Pipeline for the delivery of gas to Europe. In 2008 Turkey and Syria signed an agreement to construct a  pipeline between Aleppo and Kilis as a first segment of the Syria-Turkey connection of the Arab Gas Pipeline and Stroytransgaz signed a US$71 million contract for the construction of this section. However, this contract was annulled at the beginning of 2009 and re-tendered. This section was awarded to PLYNOSTAV Pardubice Holding, a Czech Contracting Company, who finished the project in May 2011.

Connection with Iraq 
In September 2004, Egypt, Jordan, Syria and Lebanon agreed to connect the Arab Gas Pipeline with Iraq's gas grid to allow Iraq to export gas to Europe.

Arish–Ashkelon pipeline
While it is not officially a part of the Arab Gas Pipeline project, it branches off from the same pipeline in Egypt. The pipeline is built and operated by the East Mediterranean Gas Company (EMG), a joint company of Mediterranean Gas Pipeline Ltd (28%), the Israeli company Merhav (25%), PTT (25%), EMI-EGI LP (12%), and Egyptian General Petroleum Corporation (10%). The pipeline became operational in February 2008, at a cost of $180–$550 million (the exact figure is disputed). It has since ceased operation due to sabotage of its feeder pipeline in Sinai and gas shortages in Egypt. However, although originally intended for transporting gas from Egypt to Israel, the gas shortages in Egypt have raised the possibility of operating the pipeline in the opposite direction, i.e., from Israel to Egypt beginning in 2019.

Initial supply agreement
Egypt and Israel had originally agreed to supply through the pipeline  of natural gas per year for use by the Israel Electric Corporation. In 2010, the pipeline supplied approximately half of the natural gas consumed in Israel, with the other half being supplied from domestic resources. In 2010 some Egyptian activists appealed for a legal provision against governmental authorities to stop gas flow to Israel according to the obscure contract and very low price compared to the global rates, however the provision was denied by Mubarak regime for unknown reasons. In 2011, after the Egyptian revolution against Mubarak regime, many Egyptians called for stopping the gas project with Israel due to low prices. After a fifth bombing of the pipeline, flow had to be stopped for repair.

2012 cancellation
Following the removal of Hosni Mubarak as head of state, and a perceived souring of ties between the two states, the standing agreement fell into disarray. According to Mohamed Shoeb, the head of the state-owned EGAS, the "decision we took was economic and not politically motivated. We canceled the gas agreement with Israel because they have failed to meet payment deadlines in recent months". Israeli Prime Minister Benjamin Netanyahu also said that according to him the cancellation was not "something that is born out of political developments". However, Shaul Mofaz said that the cancellation was "a new low in the relations between the countries and a clear violation of the peace treaty". Eventually, gas shortages forced Egypt to cancel most of its export agreements to all countries it previously sold gas to in order to meet internal demand.

Litigation and settlement
The Egyptian state entities supplying the pipeline attempted to declare force majeure in cancelling the gas agreement with EMG and the Israel Electric Corporation, while the latter contented the cancellation amounted to a unilateral breach of contract. The matter was referred to the International Court of Arbitration of the International Chamber of Commerce in Geneva. After four years of proceedings the arbitration panel ruled against Egypt and ordered it to pay approximately US$2 billion in fines and damages to EMG and the IEC for unilaterally cancelling the contract. Egypt then appealed the panel's decision to the Swiss courts, who also ruled against Egypt in 2017. Eventually, a settlement over the fine was reached in 2019 underwhich Egypt will pay the IEC US$500 million over the course of 8.5 years as compensation for halting the gas supplies. The settlement clears the way for gas exports from Israel to Egypt to begin.

Reverse flow agreement
Since the Egyptian revolution, Egypt has been experiencing significant domestic shortages of natural gas, causing disruptions and financial losses to various Egyptian businesses who rely on it, as well as curtailing exports of natural gas from Egypt through the Arab Gas Pipeline (even during periods when it has been available for operation) and via LNG export terminals located in Egypt. This situation raised the possibility of using the Arish-Ashkelon Pipeline to send natural gas in the reverse mode.

In March 2015, the consortium operating Israel's Tamar gas field announced it reached an agreement, subject to regulatory approvals in both countries, for the sale of at least  of natural gas over three years through the pipeline to Dolphinus Holdings – a firm representing non-governmental, industrial and commercial consumers in Egypt. The cost of rehabilitating the pipeline and converting it to allow for flow in the reverse direction is estimated at US$30 million.

In September 2018 it was announced that the consortium operating the Tamar and Leviathan fields and an Egyptian partner will spend US$518 million to buy a 39% stake in EMG in anticipation of beginning gas exports from Israel to Egypt through the Arish–Ashkelon pipeline. Test flows through the pipeline from Israel to Egypt are expected to begin in summer 2019. If tests are successful, small amounts of gas will be exported on an interruptible basis until after the Leviathan field comes online in late 2019 at which point more substantial amounts could be supplied.

Discontinuation and resumption of service 
The Egyptian pipelines carrying natural gas to Israel and Jordan stopped operating following at least 26 insurgent attacks since the start of the uprising in early 2011 until October 2014. These attacks have mostly taken place on GASCO's pipeline in northern Sinai to El-Arish which feeds the Arab Gas Pipeline and the pipeline to Israel. The attacks have been carried out by Bedouin complaining of economic neglect and discrimination by the central Cairo government. By spring 2013 the pipeline returned to continuous operation, however, due to persistent natural gas shortages in Egypt, the gas supply to Israel was suspended indefinitely while the supply to Jordan was resumed, but at a rate substantially below the contracted amount. Since then the pipeline was targeted by militants several more times.

In the mid-2010s the pipeline did not export Egyptian gas due to domestic gas shortages which forced Egypt to stop exporting gas to all countries. Exports were resumed in 2018 as gas supply in Egypt was increased (thanks mainly to the Zohr gas field coming online). In 2020 the pipeline began distributing gas originating from Israel to Jordan through the Israel–Jordan pipeline connection in northern Jordan. With the reversing of the Arish–Ashkelon pipeline in Sinai and the northern Jordan connection it is now feasible to supply natural gas from Israel into the pipeline at two separate points which should make it more resilient to supply disruptions. As of 2022, Egypt and Israel are also discussing the possibility of constructing a 70 km-long overland pipeline connecting from the existing Israeli gas grid at Ne'ot Hovav south of Beersheba to the Nitzana Border Crossing and from there to the Arish–Aqaba section in Sinai.

Timeline
On 5 February 2011, amidst the 2011 Egyptian protests an explosion was reported at the pipeline near the El Arish natural gas compressor station, which supplies pipelines to Israel and Jordan. As a result, supplies to Israel and Jordan were halted.

On 27 April 2011, an explosion at the pipeline near Al-Sabil village in the El-Arish region halted natural gas supplies to Israel and Jordan. According to the Ministry of Petroleum and Mineral Resources unidentified saboteurs blew up a monitoring room of the pipeline.

On 4 July 2011, an explosion at the pipeline near Nagah in the Sinai Peninsula halted natural gas supplies to Israel and Jordan. An official said that armed men with machine guns forced guards at the station to leave before planting an explosive charge there.

An overnight explosion on 26–27 September 2011 caused extensive damage to the pipeline at a location  from Egypt's border with Israel. As the pipeline had not been supplying gas to Israel since an earlier explosion in July, it did not affect Israel's natural gas supply. According to Egyptian authorities, local Bedouin Islamists were behind the attack.

On 14 October 2014, an explosion targeted the pipeline for the 26th time near Al-Qurayaa region south east of El-Arish city.

On 31 May 2015, the pipeline was targeted by unknown attackers for the 29th time.

It was targeted by unknown assailants again on 7 January 2016, and Wilayat Sinai claimed responsibility.

Between 2013 and 2018, the Aqaba–El Rehab section was the only section of the Arab Gas Pipeline outside Egypt that was in operation. It transported gas domestically within Jordan, mostly from an LNG reception terminal in Aqaba built after the discontinuation of gas imports from Egypt.

Starting in 2015 Egypt also occasionally used the Aqaba LNG terminal to import gas which was transported to Egypt in the reverse direction through the Arish–Aqaba section.

In 2018, Egypt resumed gas exports through the pipeline.

In 2020, exports of gas from Israel to Jordan through the Israel-Jordan pipeline connection in northern Jordan commenced. An agreement was also reached to allow gas from Israel to flow to Egypt over the Arab Gas Pipeline fed by the Israel-Jordan connection via Jordan and Sinai.

Exports of gas from Israel to Egypt through the Arish–Ashkelon pipeline began in 2020.

On 24 August 2020, an attack on a section of the pipeline north of Damascus caused widespread power outages in Syria.

On 8 September 2021 it was announced that Egypt agreed to assist Lebanon during its ongoing economic and energy crisis by attempting to resume exports of gas to Lebanon through the section of pipeline that reaches Tripoli. This section however has not been operative since the early 2010s and may require significant repairs.

See also
 Energy in Egypt
Energy in Jordan
Energy in Israel
Energy in Syria

References 

Energy infrastructure completed in 2003
Economy of the Arab League
Natural gas pipelines in Egypt
Natural gas pipelines in Jordan
Natural gas pipelines in Lebanon
Natural gas pipelines in Syria
Natural gas pipelines in Israel
Pipelines under the Mediterranean Sea
2003 establishments in Asia
21st-century architecture in Egypt